David Vernon Boger FRS (born Kutztown, Pennsylvania) is an Australian chemical engineer.

In 2017, Boger was elected a member of the National Academy of Engineering for discoveries and fundamental research on elastic and particulate fluids and their application to waste minimization in the minerals industry.

Life
He graduated from Bucknell University with a B.S. where he studied with Robert Slonaker, and from University of Illinois with an M.S. and Ph.D.

He teaches at Monash University, the University of Melbourne, and the University of Florida. He is one of three inaugural Laureate Professors at the University of Melbourne.

Work 
Boger is known for his studies of non-Newtonian fluids (which behave both as liquids and solids) which have improved the understanding of how this group of fluids flow and led to major financial and environmental benefits. Boger discovered 'perfect' non-Newtonian fluids, which are elastic and have constant viscosity and are now known as Boger fluids, which enabled him to explain how non-Newtonian fluids behave. He was able to apply his ideas to improve the disposal of "red mud", a toxic waste produced during the manufacture of aluminium from bauxite and a major environmental problem. His findings have also led to improved inks for industrial inkjet printers, insecticide chemicals that spread evenly on leaves and reduced drag in oil pipelines.

He was elected to the Fellowship of the Australian Academy of Science in 1993 and served on the Council of the Australian Academy of Science from 1999 to 2002. He was awarded the Matthew Flinders Medal and Lecture in 2000. In 2007 he was elected Fellow of the Royal Society and of the Royal Society of Victoria.

Honours and awards
2005 Prime Minister's Prize for Science 
2000 Matthew Flinders Medal and Lecture by the Australian Academy of Science
2017 Elected to the US National Academy of Engineering

References

1939 births
Living people
Australian chemical engineers
Fellows of the Royal Society
People from Kutztown, Pennsylvania
Bucknell University alumni
Grainger College of Engineering alumni
Academic staff of Monash University
Academic staff of the University of Melbourne
University of Florida faculty
Fellows of the Australian Academy of Technological Sciences and Engineering
Fellows of the Australian Academy of Science
Chemical engineering academics